This page documents all U.S. tornadoes confirmed in 1951. Due to lack of modern radar and storm spotters, tornado counts from this period are much lower than what we see today.

Confirmed tornadoes

January

January 6 event

January 11 event

February

February 1 event

February 6 event

February 19 event

February 20 event

March

March 2 event

March 12 event

March 28 event

March 29 event

March 30 event

April

April 5 event

April 20 event

April 21 event

May

There were 57 tornadoes confirmed in the US in May.

June

There were 76 tornadoes confirmed in the US in June.

June 19 event

June 25 event

June 26 event

June 27 event

July

There were 23 tornadoes confirmed in the US in July.

August

There were 27 tornadoes confirmed in the US in August.

September

There were 9 tornadoes confirmed in the US in September.

September 26 event

October

There were 2 tornadoes confirmed in the US in October.

November

There were 12 tornadoes confirmed in the US in November.

December

There were 10 tornadoes confirmed in the US in December.

See also
Tornadoes of 1951
List of North American tornadoes and tornado outbreaks

Notes

References

1951
Tornadoes of 1951
Tornadoes
Tornadoes, United States
1951